Pinna may refer to:

Biology
 Pinna (anatomy), the outer part of the ear - also referred to as the auricle
 Pinna (bivalve), a genus of bivalve molluscs also known as "pen shells"
 Pinna (botany), a primary segment of a compound leaf
 Brachypodium retusum, the Maltese name for the plant species.

People with the surname
 Christophe Pinna (born 1968), French martial artist
 Giovanni Pinna, a paleontologist and describer of the Triassic reptile Drepanosaurus
 Mattheus Pinna da Encarnaçao (1687–1764), Brazilian theologian
 Nicola Pinna (born 1974), Italian chemist
 Paola Pinna (born 1974), Italian politician
 Salvatore Pinna (born 1975), Italian soccer player
 Sandrine Pinna (born 1987), as 張榕容 (Chang Jung-jung aka Zhāng Róngróng)), Taiwanese actress

People with the given name
 Pinna Nesbit (1896–1950), Canadian silent film actress

Places
 Rosh Pinna, a settlement in Israel
 Rosh Pina Airport

Other
 , a Porpoise-class U.S. Navy submarine
 De Pinna (1885–1969), U.S. clothes company
 Pinna Park, a fictional location in Super Mario Sunshine

See also
 Hypselodoris pinna (H. pinna), a species of sea slug
 Vietteania pinna (V. pinna), a species of moth